Gaël Sébastien Monfils (born 1 September 1986) is a French professional tennis player. He has been ranked as high as world No. 6 in singles by the Association of Tennis Professionals (ATP), which he achieved in November 2016. His career highlights include reaching two major semifinals at the 2008 French Open and 2016 US Open, and three ATP Masters 1000 finals – two at the Paris Masters in 2009 and 2010, and the other at the 2016 Monte-Carlo Masters. Monfils was named the ATP Newcomer of the Year in 2005. He has won eleven ATP Tour singles titles and been runner-up twenty-two times, and has reached at least one ATP Tour singles final every year since 2005.

Early life 
Gaël Sébastien Monfils was born on 1 September 1986 in Paris, where he was raised. His father Rufin Monfils is from Guadeloupe and is a former pro football player and France Telecom employee. His mother, Sylvette Cartesse, is from Martinique and worked as a nurse.

Junior career (2002–2004)
Monfils played his first junior match in January 2002 at the age of 15 at a grade 4 tournament in Sweden. Through this junior career, he compiled a singles win–loss record of 83–22, reaching the No. 1 junior combined world ranking in February 2004. Over the course of the same year, he won the boys' singles titles at the Australian Open, the French Open and Wimbledon respectively. He was also crowned International Tennis Federation youth world champion. His win streak at junior grand slams ended at the US Open with a third round loss to Viktor Troicki.

2002 
In 2002, Monfils finished runner-up at the Dutch Junior Open and won the German Junior Open. He ended the year ranked as the No. 4 junior in the world and also represented France in the Junior Davis Cup.

2003 
Monfils got off to a positive start in 2003 and earned his first career ATP point at the France Futures No. 13 by reaching the second round. He also reached the second round at the France Futures No. 14, Egypt Futures No. 2 and the Spain Futures No. 28. In that year, he played a total of nine Futures events. This included a showing in the doubles final at the Spain Futures No. 27. In junior events, he was a semifinalist at Orange Bowl (losing to Marcos Baghdatis) and USTA International Winter Championships (losing to Sebastian Rieschick). He reached the quarterfinals of the Australian Open juniors tournament (losing to Florin Mergea) and won the doubles title at the Victorian Junior Championships (with Josselin Ouanna). He was No. 21 in junior rankings at the end of the year.

2004 
In 2004, the French teenager finished as the world's No. 1 junior, winning the first three of four junior Grand Slam events (Australian Open, French Open and Wimbledon). He improved his ATP Entry Ranking by over 700 positions. In October, he made his ATP debut as a wildcard entrant at the Moselle Open in Metz and, after winning his first ATP match against Xavier Malisse, reached the quarterfinals in which he lost to countryman Richard Gasquet. He qualified for the 2004 Paris Masters and reached the second round, beating former Top 10 player Thomas Enqvist before falling to world No. 3 Lleyton Hewitt. He won junior titles at the Australian Open, French Open (defeating Alex Kuznetsov) and Wimbledon. He did not drop a set in Australia and lost one set each at the French Open and Wimbledon. He reached the third round at the US Open (losing to Viktor Troicki). He also won the LTA International Junior Championship in Roehampton (defeating Andy Murray). He was the runner-up at the Australian Hardcourt Junior Championships (losing to Mischa Zverev) and was 31–2 in junior events. In April, he reached his first career Futures final at the Italy Futures No. 4. A week later, he won his first Futures title at the Great Britain Futures No. 1 (defeating Alex Bogdanović). He reached the quarterfinals of the Grenoble Challenger. He went 14–6 in Futures and 3–5 in Challengers in 2004.

In doubles, Monfils reached the final the at France Futures No. 7 (with Ouanna). He reached the semifinals at the Australian Open and the quarterfinals at the French Open (with Ouanna).

Junior Grand Slam results - Singles:

Australian Open: W (2004)
French Open: W (2004)
Wimbledon: W (2004)
US Open: 3R (2004)

Junior Grand Slam results - Doubles:

Australian Open: SF (2004)
French Open: QF (2004)
Wimbledon: A (-)
US Open: A (-)

Professional career

2004: ATP debut and quarterfinal
Monfils officially turned pro in 2004 at the age of 17. He solely played ITF Futures events from early 2003 to mid 2004 winning two titles.

Monfils made his ATP debut at the 2004 Open de Moselle after receiving a wildcard into the main draw where he defeated 2nd seed Xavier Malisse in the first round for his first ever ATP win. He followed this up with another victory over Olivier Patience in the second round to reach the quarterfinals where he lost to fellow wildcard and junior and eventual finalist Richard Gasquet in straight sets. Three weeks later, he qualified for the 2004 Paris Masters, his first Masters 1000 tournament. There, he defeated fellow qualifier and former world number 4 Thomas Enqvist in the first round before losing in the second round to 2nd seed and world number 3 Lleyton Hewitt in straight sets.

Monfils ended 2004 with a year-end ranking of 239. A remarkable jump from his ranking of 925 at the start of the year.

2005: First ATP title
After having turned pro the previous year, the young Frenchman then made one of the biggest moves in the top 50 from the previous season, climbing 200 ranking spots and capturing his first ATP title, whilst also reaching two additional finals. In the first six months, he won Challenger titles in Besançon and Tunis, defeating Christophe Rochus and Fabrice Santoro respectively. He would then reach the fourth round at the Miami Masters during this time (losing to Dominik Hrbatý), as well as the third round of Wimbledon, where he lost to Mario Ančić. Monfils compiled a 10–14 record in ATP level play and 12–1 in Challengers through July.

In the last three months, he went 15–8, highlighted by his first ATP clay title at the Idea Prokom Open in Sopot, defeating Florian Mayer in the final. Monfils then struggled with a 2–5 mark before reaching the final in two of the last three indoor tournaments of the season, both in his native country in Metz (losing to Ivan Ljubičić) and Lyon (losing to Andy Roddick). He went 11–4 in tie-breaks and 1–2 vs. Top 10 opponents, defeating world No. 10 Gastón Gaudio in his first match of the season in Doha. Monfils compiled records of 12–10 on hard courts, 6–7 on clay, 5–2 on carpet and 2–3 on grass. He finished the year as the No. 3 Frenchman, behind only world No. 16 Richard Gasquet and world No. 26 Sébastien Grosjean.

2006: Breaking Top 25
In his first tournament of 2006, Doha, he reached the final, but lost in two sets to world No. 1 Roger Federer. In a surprising event in Las Vegas, there was a paddle tennis tournament held by the Tennis Channel. Monfils was given a wildcard into the doubles event, but became more interested and inquired about getting a singles wildcard into the main draw. However, he received an entry into the qualifying singles (which he won). Monfils competed in the main draw of this paddle tennis tournament and surprised everyone when he ousted world No. 1 paddle tennis player Scott Freedman and eventually went on to win the whole tournament.

In May, Monfils reached the semifinals of the Rome Masters, before losing to eventual champion Rafael Nadal in straight sets. En route to the semifinals, Monfils defeated former world No. 1 Andy Roddick. He then entered the Hamburg Masters event, where he lost in straight sets to fellow teenager Andy Murray in the first round. After that, he faced Murray once more, this time in the first round of the French Open. After a tough five–set battle, Monfils emerged victorious. Monfils then proceeded to play Belgian Dick Norman in the second round. Once again, the match went to five sets, and Monfils got the better of his opponent. He then faced his toughest opponent yet, American James Blake. Blake was the favourite for the win, as the eighth seed, while Monfils was seeded 25th. However, Monfils defeated Blake in another five-set match. He described this run as a marathon. Blake said of Monfils that 'he was the fastest man on the tour'. The fourth round was Monfils' last, as he lost to Novak Djokovic in straight sets.

As a result of his progress at the French Open, Monfils moved up five positions to reach a then career high of No. 23. This also made him the No. 1 player in France, two positions ahead of Sébastien Grosjean. Monfils then entered the Stella Artois Championships, where he won his first-round match against Jürgen Melzer. He then played the American Bobby Reynolds and won in straight sets. His third-round encounter with Ivan Ljubičić was the third time he faced the world No. 4. Monfils triumphed in straight sets. His quarterfinal draw was with James Blake, whom he had met earlier at the French Open. This time Blake succeeded. After having lost a set, Monfils retired as a result of a back injury. This injury effectively ruled him out of the Nottingham Open the following week.

At Wimbledon, Monfils suffered a surprising first-round exit when defeated by Igor Kunitsyn. Monfils won the first set, but ended up losing the next three.

2007: 50 career singles wins
At the 2007 Australian Open, Monfils lost to his compatriot Richard Gasquet in the third round in four sets. Monfils had a good run in Poertschach as a warm-up for the French Open, but lost in the final against Juan Mónaco of Argentina in straight sets. He lost in the third round of the French Open to David Nalbandian in a four-set match. At Wimbledon, Monfils reached the third round without dropping a set, where he lost to Nikolay Davydenko, the sixth seed, in straight sets. In July, Monfils made it to the semifinals of the 2007 Legg Mason Tennis Classic, before losing to American John Isner in three tiebreaks. Monfils withdrew from the 2007 US Open with a hamstring injury. He also was forced to withdraw from the 2008 Australian Open due to the same injury.

2008: French Open semifinals
At the 2008 French Open, Monfils reached a semifinals berth for the first time at any Grand Slam, becoming the first Frenchman to reach the semifinals since 2001. Monfils was defeated by top seed Roger Federer in four sets. A shoulder injury forced Monfils to withdraw from Wimbledon shortly before he was due to play his first-round match. Monfils was selected by France to play at the Olympics in Beijing, where he lost to third seed Novak Djokovic in the quarterfinals. At the 2008 US Open, Monfils lost in the fourth round to Mardy Fish in straight sets, after having previously defeated former world No. 3 David Nalbandian, also in straight sets. At the Thailand Open, Monfils reached the semifinals, losing to Jo-Wilfried Tsonga in two sets. Monfils lost in the final of the BA-CA Tennis Trophy in straight sets to Philipp Petzschner in the final.

2009: Top 10, second ATP title and first Masters final
Monfils played his first tournament at the Qatar Open and caused a two-set upset in the quarterfinals against Rafael Nadal. Monfils lost to finalist Andy Roddick in three sets, after being up a break in the first set and losing it. At the 2009 Australian Open, Monfils lost to fellow Frenchman Gilles Simon in the fourth round, retiring due to a wrist injury. At the Abierto Mexicano Telcel, Monfils lost in the final to Nicolás Almagro. Monfils competed at the 2009 Monte Carlo Masters, losing in the first round to Janko Tipsarević in straight sets.

His recent knee injury, caused by Osgood-Schlatter disease, resulted in his withdrawal from both the Rome Masters and the Madrid Masters. However, he competed at the French Open and easily won his first-round match against Bobby Reynolds. He then completed another straight-set victory in the second round by overcoming Victor Crivoi. In the third round, Monfils beat Jürgen Melzer in four sets. Against Melzer, Monfils made one of the most spectacular plays of the tournament, hitting a diving shot back to Melzer, sliding to save another point of Melzer and then putting the point away. He then played a much-anticipated fourth-round match against Andy Roddick, who made 28 unforced errors en route to losing to Monfils in straight sets. Monfils then lost, as in the previous year, to Roger Federer, this time in the quarterfinals.

Monfils withdrew from Wimbledon due to a wrist injury. Monfils returned to competition at the Canadian Masters. In his first-round match, he defeated Marat Safin. He then lost to qualifier Juan Carlos Ferrero in his second match, ending his Masters tournament campaign. At the 2009 US Open, he lost to world No. 3 Rafael Nadal in the fourth round in four sets. However, Monfils would bounce back from that defeat by winning the Open de Moselle. As the No. 1 seed, he ended up facing Philipp Kohlschreiber in the final and won in two sets. Despite suffering from jetlag, Monfils also made the quarterfinals at the Malaysian Open, held in Kuala Lumpur, where he was beaten in straight sets by Nikolay Davydenko.

At the Japan Open, Monfils reached the semifinal stage, losing to eventual champion Jo-Wilfried Tsonga. His next tournament was the Shanghai Masters, losing against Ivan Ljubičić in the third round. He lost the first set and then was forced to retire with a back injury. At the 2009 Paris Masters, Monfils made his first Masters final, where was defeated by Novak Djokovic.

2010: Third ATP title
Monfils began his season at the Brisbane International, where he was seeded third. He lost to defending champion, Czech Radek Štěpánek in the semifinals. He withdrew from the Medibank International in Sydney, Australia, citing a shoulder injury. At the 2010 Australian Open, Monfils lost in the round of 32 to John Isner in four sets. Monfils was the first seed at the SA Tennis Open, where he lost in the semifinals to Feliciano López. He then played in the ABN AMRO World Tennis Tournament in Rotterdam, where he fell in the quarterfinals to the eventual runner-up, Russian Mikhail Youzhny in three sets. Monfils also fell in the quarterfinals at the 2010 Open 13 in Marseille, France, as the third seed to Julien Benneteau in straight sets.

At the Indian Wells Masters, seeded twelfth, after receiving a bye in the first round, Monfils lost to Simon Greul in three sets. Monfils withdrew from three consecutive Masters 1000 events – the Sony Ericsson Open, the 2010 Monte Carlo Masters and the 2010 Rome Masters. He was set to return at the Estoril Open and receive a wildcard, but withdrew due to a stomach injury. He finally made his return at the 2010 Madrid Masters and reached the quarterfinals without losing a set, where he lost to third seed Rafael Nadal. He then played at the Open de Nice Côte d'Azur in Nice, France, where he lost in the quarterfinals to Potito Starace. His next tournament was the 2010 French Open, where he had reached the quarterfinals the year before. He was up two sets and a break, before being upset by Fabio Fognini in a match over two days.

Starting his grass-court season, Monfils lost in the second round at the Aegon Championships to Rainer Schüttler in three sets. Playing at Wimbledon for the first time since 2007, he won his first match in straight sets against Leonardo Mayer, and his second round match in four sets against Karol Beck. He eventually lost to grass-court specialist and former Wimbledon champion Lleyton Hewitt in straight sets. At the 2010 MercedesCup, he reached his first final of the year by beating Daniel Gimeno-Traver in three sets. He was forced to retire in the final against Albert Montañés.

At the 2010 US Open, he lost to Novak Djokovic in three sets in windy conditions. It was his first quarterfinals at a major besides the French Open. He is also the first Frenchman to make the US Open quarterfinals since Arnaud Clément in 2000. Monfils was runner-up at the Rakuten Japan Open, losing to Rafael Nadal in two sets. At the Open Sud de France, Monfils won his third tournament, defeating Ivan Ljubičić in three sets. Monfils was seeded twelfth at the 2010 Paris Masters and successfully reached the final for the second consecutive year, this time also scoring three Top 10 wins (Fernando Verdasco in third round, Andy Murray in the quarterfinals and Roger Federer in the semifinals) en route to doing so. In the final, he was defeated by Robin Söderling.

2011: 200 career singles wins
Monfils started 2011 at the AAMI Kooyong Classic where, in the final, he lost to Australian and former world No. 1 Lleyton Hewitt. Following the 2011 Australian Open, Monfils next played in San Jose. He was able to reach the semifinals, before he had to withdraw with a left wrist injury that had been affecting him since January.

At the 2011 French Open, Monfils defeated seventh seed David Ferrer in five sets to reach the quarterfinals. In the quarterfinals, he lost to Roger Federer in straight sets. Monfils entered Wimbledon as the ninth seed. He defeated Matthias Bachinger and Grega Žemlja before falling in the third round to Łukasz Kubot of Poland in four sets.

At the Legg Mason Tennis Classic in Washington, D.C., he reached the finals with victories over Ryan Sweeting, Dmitry Tursunov, Janko Tipsarević and John Isner. In the final, he lost in straight sets to Radek Štěpánek. He reached the quarterfinals of both the 2011 Canadian Masters and the Cincinnati Masters, where he lost to Novak Djokovic. In July, he reached his career-high ranking of world No. 7. At the 2011 US Open, he lost in the second round to Juan Carlos Ferrero after a hard-fought match five set match. Monfils then won his fourth ATP career title in October at the Stockholm Open by beating Jarkko Nieminen in the final. It was Nieminen's 11th ATP-level career final and Monfils' 15th.

2012: Setbacks and injuries
Monfils began 2012 reaching the final of the Qatar Open. On his way to the final, he beat Rui Machado, Benjamin Becker, Viktor Troicki and Rafael Nadal. In the final, Monfils faced Jo-Wilfried Tsonga, who had received a walkover after Roger Federer withdrew from the tournament due to a back problem. Monfils proceeded to lose the final in straight sets. At the 2012 Australian Open, Monfils progressed to the third round before bowing out to Mikhail Kukushkin in five sets. Monfils was suffering from a back injury he received in the previous round. In his next tournament, Montpellier, Monfils reached the final, losing to Tomáš Berdych in three sets. This brought his finals record to just 4 titles out of 17 finals.

He reached the third round of the 2012 Madrid Masters, again losing to Berdych. He did not play on tour after Nice from May to September due to a knee injury.
The comeback came in September in Metz, where he reached the quarterfinals, but lost to Andreas Seppi in three sets. After 2 more tournaments, Monfils withdrew from the 2012 Japan Open in October, citing pain in his right knee and ended his season early.

2013: Return to Top 40
Monfils attempted another comeback with the beginning of the 2013 season in Doha, where he was able to reach the quarterfinals. He reached the semifinals in Auckland, being eliminated by David Ferrer. He made it to the third round of the 2013 Australian Open, but was defeated there by compatriot Gilles Simon.

He then played in Montpellier, where he was defeated in the second round by Richard Gasquet. He received a wildcard into Rotterdam, but was defeated in the first round by Juan Martín del Potro. He received a wildcard for the 2013 French Open after a good clay season with a win at the Bordeaux Challenger and a final at the Nice ATP tournament, he upset Berdych in the first round of the French Open, who was seeded fifth. He continued his quest by defeating Ernests Gulbis in round two. In the third round he faced Tommy Robredo. Monfils won the first two sets, but lost the last three. During the match, Monfils had four match points, but couldn't win any of them. Monfils reached the final in Winston-Salem, but bowed out to Austria's Jürgen Melzer in the second set due to an unspecified injury, securing the championship for Melzer. Just three days later on 27 August, Monfils defeated 105th-ranked Adrian Ungur of Romania in the first round of the US Open but lost to John Isner in the second round.

At the 2013 Shanghai Masters in October, Monfils upset fifth seed Roger Federer in the third round before losing to world No. 2, defending and eventual champion Novak Djokovic in the quarterfinals.

2014: 300 career singles wins
Monfils reached his third final in Doha and lost to Rafael Nadal in three sets. He was once again beaten by Nadal in the third round of the 2014 Australian Open.

Monfils bounced back by winning Montpellier, defeating Richard Gasquet. He hurt his wrist in a match against Grigor Dimitrov and did not play again until the 2014 French Open, where he made it to the quarterfinals before losing to Andy Murray.

At the 2014 US Open, Monfils reached the quarterfinals for a second time and just narrowly missed reaching his second Grand Slam semifinal when he lost to Roger Federer in five sets, despite leading by two sets to love and holding two match points against his serve in the fourth set.

In the Davis Cup final held in Lille, Monfils won the second match against Roger Federer in straight sets. France however, went on to become the tournament runners-up, losing to Switzerland 3–1.

2015: Return to Top 15
Monfils played his first tournament at the 2015 Australian Open. He defeated Lucas Pouille in 5 sets in the first round before being ousted against Jerzy Janowicz in another five setter.

He reached the final of the Open 13 in Marseille, that of which saw him lose to Gilles Simon.

For his season debut on clay at the 2015 Monte Carlo Masters, he successively beat Andrey Kuznetsov, Roger Federer and Grigor Dimitrov but lost to Tomáš Berdych in the semifinals.

At the 2015 French Open, he defeated Édouard Roger-Vasselin in the first round and Diego Schwartzman in the second round in five sets but his best performance remains the third round match against Pablo Cuevas. As Cuevas led two sets to one and was serving at 4–1 in the fourth set, he faced a different Monfils, galvanized by the crowd, who came back and won in five sets. Monfils then lost in the round of 16 to Roger Federer in four sets.

The grass season started well for Monfils as he reached the semifinals of the Mercedes Cup in Stuttgart, losing only to Rafael Nadal. Unfortunately, he injured himself in the quarterfinals of Halle and could not finish his match against Andreas Seppi. He was however, able to participate at Wimbledon, defeating Pablo Carreño Busta and Adrian Mannarino before again losing to Gilles Simon in the third round in five sets.

Due to injuries, his performance in America over the next few months was poor and ultimately saw him retire in the middle of his first-round match of the 2015 US Open against Illya Marchenko. He also announced the end of his collaboration with his coach Jan de Witt, who was later replaced by Mikael Tillström.

His last tournament of the year was the Paris Masters. After leading by one set and 4–0 he was knocked out in the first round by compatriot Benoît Paire. He said after the match he got disturbed when the crowd started to whistle at his opponent. In his own words, Monfils defined 2015 as a "year of regrets" where he "regressed, wasted a year because of certain choices".

2016: US Open semifinals, first ATP 500 title, World No. 6
Monfils started the 2016 season by entering the 2016 Australian Open where he was seeded twenty-third, Monfils took advantage of a draw which opened up in his section to reach the singles quarterfinals of the Australian Open for the first time. There, he lost to the thirteenth seed Milos Raonic in four sets. His good form continued going into the Rotterdam Open, where he reached his first final of 2016, defeating Ernests Gulbis, Borna Ćorić, Alexander Zverev and Philipp Kohlschreiber en route before losing to Martin Kližan in three sets.

In March, Monfils reached the quarterfinals of two ATP World Tour Masters 1000 tournaments – Indian Wells and Miami, losing to Raonic and Kei Nishikori respectively. Monfils then reached a third career ATP World Tour Masters 1000 final and second final of 2016 in Monte Carlo, that of which saw him defeat countryman and world No. 9 Jo-Wilfried Tsonga in the semifinals en route, before ultimately losing in the final to the eight-time Monte Carlo Masters champion Rafael Nadal in three sets. Monfils then looked to again replicate this form at the next two clay-court ATP World Tour Masters 1000 tournaments – the 2016 Madrid Masters and the 2016 Rome Masters. He caught a viral infection during his stay in Madrid and, as a result, ended up losing in the second round to Pablo Cuevas. This viral infection ultimately saw Monfils withdraw from the 2016 French Open as well. Prior to that however, he lost in the first round of the 2016 Rome Masters to Thomaz Bellucci.

Still feeling sick, Monfils wouldn't play again until Wimbledon. In an attempt to recover, he lost his first-round match with compatriot Jérémy Chardy in five sets.

Monfils earned his first ever ATP World Tour 500 Series singles title in July, in the second week after Wimbledon, defeating Croatian Ivo Karlović in the final in three sets on the hard courts of the Citi Open in Washington, D.C., after fighting from a set and a break down with Karlović serving for the championship in the second set, and moments later, saving a championship point in the tiebreak. The win was Monfils' first ATP World Tour singles title in over two years, although he had previously reached at least one final every year since 2005. All of his previous ATP World Tour singles titles came under the ATP World Tour 250 Series category, despite the fact that he had already reached at least 3 finals each across all categories, except Grand Slams and Tour Finals.

The following week, Monfils reached the semifinals of the 2016 Canadian Masters after dispatching 2016 Wimbledon singles finalist Milos Raonic in the quarterfinals, to set up a tie against world No. 1 Novak Djokovic, to whom he lost in straight sets, ending his career-best win streak of 9 consecutive matches.

In the second week of August, since Richard Gasquet withdrew from the 2016 Olympics tennis tournament because of an injury to his back, Monfils would pair up with Jo-Wilfried Tsonga in the men's doubles draw. In the men's singles draw of the same tournament, Monfils reached the quarterfinals and lost to eventual bronze medalist Kei Nishikori, despite having 3 match point chances in the deciding set.

In late August, Monfils entered the 2016 US Open seeded tenth and reached the semifinals without dropping a set, defeating prominent past and present players on the tour Gilles Müller, Jan Šátral, Nicolás Almagro, Marcos Baghdatis and Lucas Pouille en route. He eventually lost a controversial match to Djokovic in four sets. The controversy came due to Monfils soft balling many shots and appearing that he was not giving the match his all. As a result, Monfils was jeered by the crowd and criticized by John McEnroe, who claimed that he was "unprofessional".

In the first week of October, Monfils entered and was seeded second at the 2016 Japan Open, another ATP World Tour 500 Series tournament, where he also reached the semifinals without dropping a set, after again beating Ivo Karlović in the quarterfinals to set up a tie against eventual champion Nick Kyrgios, whom he lost to in two very competitive and entertaining sets. Monfils then entered the Shanghai Masters seeded sixth and received a bye into the second round, where he defeated Kevin Anderson in straight sets. In the third round, he then faced David Goffin. Despite winning the first set and leading by a double break in the second set serving at 4–1, he lost the next 5 games and was forced to play a decider, where he lost 2–6. However, the run guaranteed him to match his career-high ranking of No. 7 once again.

The following week Monfils entered the 2016 Stockholm Open, where he was seeded first. After receiving a first-round bye, he was upset by Gastão Elias in straight sets. The loss resulted in his ranking dropping down one spot, back to No. 8.

Despite missing the penultimate week of the 2016 season, Monfils became the sixth person to qualify for the 2016 ATP World Tour Finals. This year marked his debut at the season-ending event. After falling to Raonic 6–3, 6–4 and losing a 3-set match to Dominic Thiem, Monfils withdrew from the tournament with an injury. Goffin was brought in to replace Monfils for one match.

2017: 400 career singles wins
For the whole of 2017, Monfils only managed to progress beyond the round of 16 of the singles main draw in just three ATP World Tour tournaments – the 2017 Open 13 (losing in the quarterfinals to Richard Gasquet), the 2017 Dubai Tennis Championships (losing in the quarterfinals to Fernando Verdasco) and the 2017 Aegon International Eastbourne (losing in the final to Novak Djokovic). In his second round match against No. 5 seed Kei Nishikori at the 2017 Canadian Masters, Monfils saved four match points in the final set tie-break to advance to the third round; he lost his third round match against No. 12 seed Roberto Bautista Agut in three tight sets, losing the last two on tie-breaks. His victory against Nishikori at the Canadian Masters marked the first time in seven years that Monfils had come from a set down to defeat a Top 10 opponent and it was just the third time in his career (3–62) that he had done so. Monfils saw his year-end position in the ATP singles rankings slip to world No. 46 as he struggled with his fitness in 2017. He was forced to withdraw from six tournaments because of various ailments and concluded his season after losing in the third round of the 2017 US Open, citing a right knee injury.

2018: Wimbledon fourth round

Monfils won his seventh ATP World Tour singles title at the 2018 Qatar Open. He had lost his previous three Qatar Open singles finals. Appearing in the 2018 edition of the tournament as an unseeded wildcard, he advanced to final via walkover after top seed Dominic Thiem had to withdraw from their match in the semifinals because of illness. In the final, he defeated Andrey Rublev 6–2, 6–3 in 61 minutes. In his next tournament, the 2018 Australian Open, Monfils lost to the No. 14 seed Novak Djokovic in four sets in the second round. Monfils then made the semifinals of the 2018 Argentina Open, upsetting seventh seed Pablo Cuevas in the first round before being handily defeated by Dominic Thiem in the semifinals. Continuing his South American swing, Monfils played two stunning matches during the 2018 Rio Open. In round one, Monfils completed a significant comeback to beat Horacio Zeballos, saving one match point in the process with a booming forehand. In round two, the Frenchman pulled off an even bigger stunner, defeating top seed and world No. 3 Marin Čilić in a match that stretched over two days due to inclement weather. The match was halted at 6–3, 6–6(7–7) in Monfils' favor, a stoppage that surprised many. Monfils lost to Diego Schwartzman, the eventual champion, in the quarterfinals. Later in the year, Monfils finally made the fourth round of Wimbledon for the first time in his career, losing to Kevin Anderson.

2019: Eighth ATP title, third US Open quarterfinal & top 10 return
At the 2019 Australian Open, Monfils fell in the second round to Taylor Fritz. Monfils won the eighth ATP Tour singles title of his career at the Rotterdam Open, defeating Stan Wawrinka in a three-set final.

At the Madrid Open, the fifteenth seeded Monfils failed to convert two match points when he was leading 6–5 in the third and final set of his third round match against the No. 4 seed Roger Federer; Monfils eventually lost the match 0–6, 6–4, 6–7(3–7). 
At the French Open, Monfils lost in the fourth round to Dominic Thiem.

At Wimbledon he retired in the first round against countryman Ugo Humbert.

One of the highlights of his year was when he reached the quarterfinals of the US Open as the 13th seed after battling past Denis Shapovalov in the third round and dispatching Pablo Andújar only losing a maximum of 2 games in each set. He lost in a five set battle to the 24th seed Matteo Berrettini.

Monfils finished the year in the top 10 at World No. 10 since February 2017.

2020: Ninth & Tenth titles, loss of form during COVID season
At the 2020 Australian Open, Monfils lost in the fourth round to Dominic Thiem. Monfils won the ninth ATP Tour singles title of his career at the Open Sud de France, defeating Vasek Pospisil in straight sets 7–5, 6–3. Monfils won his second title of the year at the Rotterdam Open, successfully defending his title by defeating Félix Auger-Aliassime in the final. This marked the first time Monfils has won two ATP Tour titles in a season.

At the French Open, Monfils lost in the first round to Alexander Bublik.

2021: Continued struggles, Olympics, 500 ATP career wins

Monfils lost in the first round of the 2021 Australian Open to Emil Ruusuvuori in five sets.

He picked up his first win in over a year in Lyon, beating lucky loser Thiago Seyboth Wild in straight sets.

In Belgrade's second tournament, Monfils lost to qualifier Roberto Carballés Baena in a third set tie-break.

At the French Open, Monfils defeated Albert Ramos-Viñolas in 4 sets, after saving a set point in the second set tie-break. In the second round he lost to Mikael Ymer. Following the clay season, Monfils quickly turned to the grass. At the 2021 Halle Open, Monfils continued to struggle as he lost in the opening round to Lloyd Harris. Following this, Monfils quickly turned to the next event of the 2021 Eastbourne International. He lost in the opening round again, this time to qualifier Max Purcell.

At the 2021 Canada Masters 1000, Monfils made his first quarterfinal appearance of the year after defeating John Millman and Frances Tiafoe. He lost to John Isner in straight sets. In the next Masters at the 2021 Western & Southern Open in Cincinnati, he defeated Alex De Minaur to reach the last 16, and the 500th win in his career on the ATP tour marking an important milestone. Monfils became the 11th active player to reach 500 singles match wins.

Monfils made his first semifinal of the year at the 2021 Moselle Open. As the 3rd seed, he defeated lucky loser Philipp Kohlschreiber in the second round to reach his second tour-level quarterfinal of the season and 8th seed Nikoloz Basilashvili to make the semifinals. He lost in the semifinals to 2nd seed Pablo Carreño Busta in straight sets. One week later at the 2021 Sofia Open, seeded second, he made his first ATP final in 18 months where he lost to top seed and defending champion Jannik Sinner in straight sets.
He continued his good form, reaching the round of 16 in Indian Wells, Vienna and at home in Paris, where he registered the fastest forehand ever at 190 km/h.

2022: 11th title, Tenth Major quarterfinal, injuries, out of top 50
As the top seed, Monfils won his eleventh title at the first Adelaide International tournament without dropping a set, beating Juan Manuel Cerúndolo, 6th seed Tommy Paul, Thanasi Kokkinakis and 2nd seed Karen Khachanov. Monfils pulled out of the second tournament with a neck injury against lucky loser Thiago Monteiro after being a break down in the third set.

At the Australian Open, Monfils defeated Federico Coria, Alexander Bublik, 16th seed Cristian Garín and Miomir Kecmanović (all in straight sets) to reach his first quarterfinal at the Australian Open since 2016, and first quarterfinal at any major since the 2019 US Open. There, he lost to Matteo Berrettini in five sets.

After skipping the start of the clay season, Monfils played his first clay tournament of the year at the 2022 Mutua Madrid Open. Following his Madrid Masters exit, Monfils underwent a heel surgery as he missed the 2022 French Open and the entire grass season. After being out for three months, Monfils returned to action at the Montreal Masters. In his first tournament back following a lengthy absence, Monfils sustained a foot injury in his match against Jack Draper. He ended his season on 31 October 2022.

2023: Comeback
Monfils came back from a four months hiatus at the 2023 BNP Paribas Open in Indian Wells using a protected ranking. He lost to Jordan Thompson] in straight sets in the first round.

Playing style 
Monfils is usually described as a baseliner who uses placement and consistency to beat his opponents. He is well known for his athleticism and his court coverage, regularly using slides to retrieve balls, even on hard courts. His ability to go from defense to offense quickly can take his opponents by surprise. Monfils occasionally demonstrates that he is capable of generating tremendous pace on his groundstrokes off both wings, especially his forehand that can reach 190 km/h. He has garnered a reputation for showmanship and high-risk shotmaking throughout his career.

Monfils uses a semi-western grip forehand and a combination of continental/semi-western on his backhand. He possesses a strong, accurate serve capable of reaching 230 km/h, although his main focus is on consistency and placement, sometimes at the expense of power.

Equipment and apparel 
Monfils was sponsored by Nike for clothes and shoes but changed to K-Swiss in 2010. In 2013 he switched to ASICS for clothes and shoes. He was sponsored by Head for racquets but changed to Prince in 2009 and Wilson in 2012. He is currently using Wilson H19 racquet in Ultra Tour/pro paintjob. His string of choice is the Luxilon Big Banger ALU Power 16L String.

 At the start of the 2022 season, Monfils switched his apparel and racquet sponsors to the French brand Decathlon's tennis line, Artengo.

Personal life
Monfils is nicknamed "La Monf", or occasionally "Sliderman" due to his unusual sliding technique, especially on clay surfaces. He has a younger brother, Daryl, who plays tennis. Gaël and Daryl played doubles together in the 2012 Open Sud de France, losing in the first round.

Monfils was considered an athletic prodigy at school and won the French under-13 and under-14 100m championships. It was only his love for tennis that stopped him going on to compete at a higher level. His coach is on record as saying that Monfils could have made the Olympic 100m final, such was his talent.

Monfils was coached by countryman and former ATP pro Thierry Champion (since September 2004) but they parted company in September 2006. Nevertheless, his fitness trainer is still Rémi Barbarin. He announced a partnership with a new coach, Tarik Benhabiles, in May 2007. However, for the 2008 season, Monfils hired Roger Rasheed as his coach. In 2011, Monfils parted ways with Rasheed and announced that his fitness coach, Patrick Chamagne would take the reins as his new full-time coach. That lasted until 2013. As of the 2015 French Open, Monfils shares coach Jan De Witt with fellow countryman Gilles Simon. 
On 15 November 2012, Monfils split with his coach.

Monfils appeared in the music video for "Hello" by Martin Solveig and Dragonette.

Monfils is married to WTA tennis player Elina Svitolina. They publicly announced their relationship in 2019, announced their engagement on 3 April 2021, and were married on 16 July. On 15 May 2022, Svitolina and Monfils announced they were expecting their first child together, a girl. On October 15, they welcomed their daughter, Skaï Monfils, and announced it in their social accounts.

Career statistics

Grand Slam performance timeline

Current after the 2022 Australian Open.

Masters tournament

Singles: 3 (3 runner-ups)

References

External links

 
 
 
 
 

1986 births
Living people
French male tennis players
Olympic tennis players of France
Tennis players at the 2008 Summer Olympics
Tennis players at the 2016 Summer Olympics
Tennis players at the 2020 Summer Olympics
Grand Slam (tennis) champions in boys' singles
Australian Open (tennis) junior champions
French Open junior champions
Wimbledon junior champions
French expatriate sportspeople in Switzerland
Tennis players from Paris
Black French sportspeople
French people of Guadeloupean descent
French people of Martiniquais descent